Steve Horowitz (born Steven Michael Horowitz on October 3, 1964) is an American composer, performing musician, producer, audio engineer, author, and teacher from Brooklyn, New York.

Horowitz is the bassist for the experimental music group, The Code International, who has been creating and releasing album-format music since 1993. He is best known as the film score composer, for the Academy Award-winning Morgan Spurlock documentary film, Super Size Me.

Education 
Horowitz attended Berkeley High School in Berkeley, California. He received his BFA in music composition at the California Institute of the Arts, studying alongside or under the mentorship of composers such as Mel Powell, Morton Subotnick, Michael Jon Fink and Stephen "Lucky" Mosko.

Since 2017, Horowitz has been an active lecturer of music composition and music for visual media (games, film and television) at San Francisco State University. He has spoken on the subject of music composition and video game audio at various American universities including New York University and CalArts.

Game Audio 
Horowitz is a long-standing audio director of Nickelodeon Digital, beginning his relationship with Nickelodeon in the year 2000, as an in-house composer for Nickelodeon Online.

In 2004, Horowitz became a contributing member of the Interactive Audio Special Interest Group, developing curriculum and procedure to be used in graduate and undergraduate interactive audio programs.

In 2013, under partnership with fellow CalArts alumni Scott Looney, Horowitz founded the Game Audio Institute. The venture was created to develop and propagate video game audio-focused educational framework, and materials to private individuals and various accredited universities, respectively. The following year, the duo authored the interactive audio textbook The Essential Guide to Game Audio: The Theory and Practice of Sound for Games.

Personal life 
Horowitz most recently resided with his wife and son in San Francisco, California.

Awards 
Horowitz's creative contributions have made him recipient of various awards:
 1997: Grammy Award in support of Todd Philips for his role as audio engineer on the compilation album True Life Blues: The Songs of Bill Monroe.
 2003: Webby Award for audio direction of the Nick.com website design.
 2003: Broadcast Design award for audio direction on Max And Ruby Toy Bowling.
 2003: Broadcast Design Award for audio direction on a Wonder Pets! interactive media project, entitled Wonder Pets Save The Day.
 2017: Kidscreen Award for audio direction on Nickelodeon Digital's Nickelodeon: Code a Character.
 2020" Kidscreen Award for music composition and audio direction on Nickelodeon's Do Not Touch augmented reality mobile game.

Discography

As Steve Horowitz

As Steve Horowitz and The Code Ensemble

As Steve Horowitz and The Virtual Code

As The Code International

Gameography

Filmography

References

External links 

 

1964 births
Musicians from Brooklyn
Living people